Directive 2001/83/EC of the European Parliament and of the Council of 6 November 2001 on the Community code relates to medicinal products for human use in mainly countries that are part of the European Union. The Directive dealt with the disparities between certain national provisions, in particular between provisions relating to medicinal products, which directly affected the functioning of the internal market of the European Union.

See also 
 EudraLex
 Directive 65/65/EEC1, requires prior approval for marketing of proprietary medicinal products
 Directive 75/318/EEC
 Directive 75/319/EEC, requires marketing authorization requests to be drawn up only by qualified experts
 Directive 93/41/EEC
 Directive 2001/20/EC
 Regulation of therapeutic goods
 European Medicines Agency

References

Health and the European Union
Pharmaceuticals policy
2001 82
2001 in law
2001 in the European Union